

Special revelation is a Christian theological term that refers to the belief that knowledge of God and of spiritual matters can be discovered through supernatural means, such as miracles or the scriptures—a disclosure of God's truth through means other than through reason. The distinction between special and general was first elucidated in-depth by the Catholic systematic theologian St. Thomas Aquinas in his discussion of the phenomenon of revelation. According to Dumitru Stăniloae, Eastern Orthodox Church’s position on general / special revelation is in stark contrast to Protestant and Catholic theologies that see a clear difference between general and special revelation. In Orthodox Christianity, he argues, there is no separation between the two and special revelation merely embodies the former in historical persons and actions.

Theologians use the term Special Revelation for the belief in God's intervention to make God's will and knowledge available that would not otherwise be available through General Revelation. They believe that disclosure of this Special Revelation is at specific times to specific persons, and believed by Christian theologians to have been generally given through scripture, miracles, and through the person and ministry of Jesus Christ.  In view of the specific substance in the immediately below paragraph it is important that recipients of Special Revelation are provided with a reference perspective for potential defense of their experiences.  This can be accomplished by viewing Special Revelation as consisting of three intensities or levels, with the middle intensity referred to as Medium Intensity, and the level deemed to be "above" that sometimes referred to as High Intensity. Such a triad will allow peace of mind for many, and will remove the challenge of having to potentially defend one's experience against another's (even to oneself), inasmuch as there are no distinct boundary areas regarding those three intensities of Special Revelation. Also, a Special Revelation comfort zone, regardless of the intensity of the experience(s), does not oblige one to have to assess implications of one having possibly transitioned to what is referred to below as Direct Revelation.   

Other means by which God reputedly gave Special Revelation were by Divine Voice or Divine Writing, angels, prophets, visions, dreams, dream-visions, Divine Dictation, inspiration, and "Spirit's guidance", or guidance from the Holy Spirit. When reviewing these examples, one can see that they refer to Direct Revelation, which is now the third type of revelation, as a distinction between Special Revelation by way of self-disclosure through the Bible and personal communication from God, some forms of which include actually hearing the voice of God.

Special Revelation is a contrast to General Revelation, which refers to the knowledge of God and spiritual matters which reputedly can be discovered through natural means, such as observation of nature, philosophy and reasoning, conscience or providence.  

The purpose of Special Revelation is to impart the knowledge and understanding of Jesus Christ, salvation and the atonement. Essentially it is knowledge and understanding, "that is requisite to salvation, that is, an explicit knowledge of Christ and his gospel."

The forms of special revelation as considered by mainstream Christianity are 
 Personal Experience
 Miracles
 Prophecy
 The Earthly Life of Jesus Christ
 The Scriptures (as a source of special Revelation). In divine affairs, we are saved by the grace of Christ from our sins and guilt before God

See also
 Continuous revelation
 Private revelation
 Supernatural revelation
 Theophany

References

Prayer
Prophecy in Christianity
Christian terminology